The Forum tram stop is situated on line  of the tramway de Bordeaux.

Location
The station is located between courtyard Gambetta and the courtyard  of the Libération at Talence.

Junction

Close by
 Église Notre-Dame de Talence
 Forum des Arts et de la Culture

See also
 TBC
 Tramway de Bordeaux

External links
 

Bordeaux tramway stops
Tram stops in Talence
Railway stations in France opened in 2004